Anderson Mukomberanwa (9 February 1968 – 2003) was a Zimbabwean artist and engineer known primarily for his stone sculpture.

Mukomberanwa began his art career by studying with his father, working with hard stones native to the region.  Later in his career he took up printmaking, becoming interested in etching and woodblock printing.  He was also a painter. He had his own style of art that incorporated humor. Anderson obtained a btech degree from harare polytechnic college in 1993.There after he decided to gointo art  rather than pursue his profession as a civil engineer
Anderson died from cancer on 9 March 2003.

He was a member of Zimbabwe's acclaimed Mukomberanwa family of sculptors. He is the son of Nicholas Mukomberanwa, he was the brother of second generation sculptors Taguma, Lawrence, Ennica, and Netsai Mukomberanwa, and the cousin of Nesbert Mukomberanwa.

External links
Biographical sketch

References

1968 births
2003 deaths
Deaths from cancer in Zimbabwe
People from Mashonaland East Province
20th-century Zimbabwean sculptors
Zimbabwean engineers
20th-century engineers